The Cyclone Cowboy is a 1927 American silent Western film directed by Richard Thorpe and starring Hal Taliaferro, Violet Bird and Raye Hampton.

Cast
 Hal Taliaferro as Wally Baxter 
 Violet Bird as Norma 
 Raye Hampton as Ma Tuttle 
 Dick Lee as Gerald Weith 
 Ann Warrington as Laura Tuttle 
 George Magrill

References

External links
 

1927 films
1927 Western (genre) films
Films directed by Richard Thorpe
1920s English-language films
Pathé Exchange films
American black-and-white films
Silent American Western (genre) films
1920s American films